Osiedle Witosa is a district of Katowice. It has an area of 3.49 km2 and in 2007 had 12,401 inhabitants.

The Witosa estate (the Wincenty Witos estate) - a housing estate and an auxiliary unit of Katowice, located in the north-western part of the city, in the complex of northern districts, between Załęska, Załęska Hałda-Brynów and the western part and the city of Chorzów, in the historic commune of Załęże. The beginnings of settlement in the area of ​​the auxiliary unit are associated with the establishment of two colonies of Załęże, built in the 18th century: Obroków and Załęska Hałda. The very housing estate named after W. Witosa was built in a colony of Finnish houses in the 1970s and 1980s. Currently, the district is mainly residential and commercial. The Witosa estate is very well connected thanks to the A4 motorway running next to the estate, as well as the international railway line E 30. The district has an area of 3.49 km² (2.11% of the city's area) and in 2007 had 12,401 inhabitants (3.9% of the population)

References

Districts of Katowice